Chapala is a town and municipality in the central Mexican state of Jalisco, located on the north shore of Lake Chapala, Mexico's largest freshwater lake.  According to the 2015 census, its population is 50,738 for the municipality.  The municipality includes about 11,000 in the town of Ajijic.

Geography
Chapala is 28 miles (45 km) south-southeast of Guadalajara, on Mexican Federal Highway 44.  It is located at 20°20' North, 103°10' West.

Climate

History
Although there are several theories as to the origin of the city's name, the most likely is that it comes from Chapalac, the name of the last chief of the Nahuatl-speaking indigenous people of the region.  Chapala became an official municipality on September 10, 1864, by decree of the Jalisco State Congress.

Culture

During the First World War, in 1915, Norwegian speculators intended to make Chapala a luxury resort town. A railway was to be built, with race segregated carriages. In addition to the railway, the speculators would also provide two motor vessels to navigate the lake with connections to the other small towns at the lake shore. A first class hotel was to be built, as well as an automobile club with attached casino. An extensive dam, 8 kilometers long to provide dry land with plots for luxury dwellings. What the shareholders in the company, "Compania di Fromento di Chapala" received, was only photographs of railway carriages and locomotives. See the book; Gullfeber by Kr.Fr.Brøgger, published in Oslo 1932.

In the late 1940s the American writer Tennessee Williams settled in Chapala for a while to work on a play called The Poker Night, which later became A Streetcar Named Desire. As Williams explains in his essay "The Catastrophe of Success," Chapala offered him an ideal place to work, "a remote place among strangers where there is good swimming."

Since the 1960s, Chapala has been frequented by both Mexican and international tourists. Among the area's cultural attractions is mariachi music, which originated in the state of Jalisco. While many fine mariachi bands have been based in Chapala, the most famous groups are based in larger cities nearby.  The most famous mariachi in Mexico is Mariachi Vargas de Tecalitlán, founded in the late 19th century in the southern Jalisco city of Tecalitlán, but now based in Mexico City. Although mariachi music is believed to have originated in the town of Cocula, the greatest concentration of mariachis can be found in the city of Guadalajara, located about 30 miles north of Chapala; it is considered the city that most epitomizes the external concept of Mexico propagated by the international mass media (characterized by charros, tequila, sombreros, and mariachis). A worldwide mariachi festival is held there each fall, mariachis from throughout the world (including Europe and Asia) regularly participate.

Tourism

Tony Burton describes early tourism in his book “Lake Chapala through the ages: an anthology of travellers' tales.”  Chapala, along with its namesake lake, is well established as a weekend getaway destination primarily for inhabitants of the city of Guadalajara.  Most of the area's expatriate population (originating primarily from the United States and Canada) reside not in the city proper but in and around Ajijic, a village of approximately 11,000 inhabitants located approximately 5 miles west of Chapala.  Many of these residents stay for a long time, and some try to make Chapala like "home."

Government

Municipal presidents

References

External links
−: Official Chapala (government) website

American diaspora in Mexico
Canadian diaspora in Mexico
Municipalities of Jalisco
Populated places established in 1864